Camberwell railway station may refer to:

 Camberwell railway station (England), a former station on the Thameslink line in London
 Camberwell railway station, Melbourne, on the Lilydale, Belgrave and Alamein lines in Victoria, Australia